Danny Miller may refer to:

Danny Miller (actor) (born 1991), known for his role as Aaron Dingle (formerly Livesy) in British soap opera Emmerdale
Danny Miller (Britannia High), fictional character played by Mitch Hewer
Danny Miller (economist) (born 1947), Canadian organizational theorist
Danny Miller, fictional character in Pat Barker's novel Border Crossing
Danny Miller, fictional character in the 1929 film Glorifying the American Girl
Danny Miller, fictional stage producer in the musical film Down to Earth
Danny Miller, professional wrestler, the first NWA/WCW World Television Champion
Danny Miller (radio producer), co-executive producer of Fresh Air

See also
Dan Miller (disambiguation)
Daniel Miller (disambiguation)